Proteiniphilum saccharofermentans is a Gram-negative and facultatively anaerobic bacterium from the genus of Proteiniphilum which has been isolated from a mesophilic laboratory-scale biogas reactor.

References

External links
Type strain of Proteiniphilum saccharofermentans at BacDive -  the Bacterial Diversity Metadatabase

Bacteria described in 2016
Bacteroidia